Dominique Canavèse (6 November 1923 – 28 August 2006) was a French racing cyclist. He rode in the 1952 Tour de France.

References

1923 births
2006 deaths
French male cyclists
Place of birth missing